The crimsonwings (Cryptospiza) are a genus of small passerine birds belonging to the estrildid finch family (Estrildidae). There are four species. They are found in parts of Sub-Saharan Africa, particularly the Albertine Rift; all four species occur there and two, Shelley's and dusky crimsonwings, are found nowhere else. They are secretive birds which mainly inhabit mountain forests with dense undergrowth. They usually forage on or near the ground, feeding mainly on seeds such as those of grasses and balsam.

They are 11–13 cm long with short wings and a short, rounded tail. The bill is thick and conical and either black or red. They all have a reddish back and rump and olive or grey underparts. Juvenile birds are duller than the adults.

Destruction and degradation of their forest habitat is a potential threat to the crimsonwings and Shelley's crimsonwing is classified as vulnerable by the IUCN.

Species list

References
Clement, Peter; Harris, Alan & Davies, John (1993) Finches and Sparrows: An Identification Guide, Christopher Helm, London.
Sinclair, Ian & Ryan, Peter (2003) Birds of Africa south of the Sahara, Struik, Cape Town.

 
 
Taxa named by Tommaso Salvadori